WRBJ-TV (channel 34) is a religious television station licensed to Magee, Mississippi, United States, serving the Jackson, Hattiesburg and Meridian television markets as an owned-and-operated station of the Trinity Broadcasting Network (TBN). The station's transmitter is located near Raleigh, Mississippi, in the Bienville National Forest.

History
WRBJ began broadcasting as a UPN affiliate via Time Warner Cable on January 5, 2006, and over-the-air broadcasting began on February 8. On March 21, 2006, it was announced that WRBJ would join the new CW Television Network, and on September 18, WRBJ became a CW affiliate. The station was founded by St. Louis-based Roberts Broadcasting.

Ironically, the call letters WRBJ were assigned briefly to WDBT radio (now WFOR) in Hattiesburg, the first radio station in Mississippi. Only since September 2006 when Roberts Broadcasting bought out Urban radio station WRJH did those call letters return to the market.

On March 31, 2011, WRBJ's license was initially cancelled by the FCC for failure to file for either a license to cover or an extension of its digital construction permit (the license for sister station WZRB in Columbia, South Carolina was initially cancelled for the same reasons two days earlier). However, Roberts Broadcasting filed an appeal, stating that the licenses to cover were improperly filed upon the digital transition. The FCC agreed, and reinstated the licenses of the two stations on April 19. Roberts had to file for new licenses to cover.

On October 22, 2012, Roberts announced that it had sold WRBJ to the Trinity Broadcasting Network. The Christian broadcaster was previously available in the Jackson area on low-powered WJKO-LP, which was later sold to the Daystar Television Network. The sale was approved by a bankruptcy court on January 17, 2013, and TBN officially took over operational control of WRBJ five months later, on May 24, 2013. CW network programming would not be seen in the Jackson area until WJTV-DT2 picked up The CW in October 2013.

Despite having stopped broadcasting CW programming on May 24, 2013, WRBJ's website remained operational for a year afterward.

On July 17, 2013, the station's call sign was modified with the addition of a -TV suffix.

Subchannels

WRBJ shut down its analog signal, over UHF channel 34, on January 16, 2009. The station "flash-cut" its digital signal into operation UHF channel 34.

References

External links

Trinity Broadcasting Network affiliates
Television channels and stations established in 2006
2006 establishments in Mississippi
RBJ-TV